Dekeidoryxis asynacta is a moth of the family Gracillariidae. It is known from the state of Assam in India and from Nepal.

The wingspan is 5.3–7.8 mm.

The larvae feed on Maesa chisia. They probably mine the leaves of their host plant.

References

Acrocercopinae
Moths of Asia
Moths described in 1918